The 2017 1. deild karla (English: Men's First Division) was the 63rd season of second-tier Icelandic football. Twelve teams contested in the league. The season began on 5 May and concluded on 23 September.

Teams
The league was contested by twelve clubs. Eight remained in the division from the 2016 season, while four new clubs joined the 1. deild karla:
 Fylkir and Þróttur R. were relegated from the 2016 Úrvalsdeild, replacing KA and Grindavík who were promoted to the 2017 Úrvalsdeild.
 ÍR and Grótta were promoted from the 2016 2. deild karla, in place of Huginn and Fjarðabyggð who were relegated to the 2017 2. deild karla.

Club information

Managerial changes

League table

Results grid
Each team plays every opponent once home and away for a total of 22 matches per club, and 132 matches altogether.

Top goalscorers

References

External links
 Fixtures at ksí.is

1. deild karla (football) seasons
Iceland
Iceland
2